Gambetta may refer to:

Gambetta (surname)
Gambetta (Paris Métro)
Gambetta tram stop, in Bordeaux
French armoured cruiser Léon Gambetta, ship of the French Navy, 1901–1915
Léon Gambetta class cruiser, class of ships of the French Navy